Josef Felix Pompeckj (May 10, 1867, Groß-Köllen – July 8, 1930, Berlin) was a German paleontologist and geologist.

He was born in Groß-Köllen (now Kolno in Poland). He studied geology and paleontology at the University of Königsberg, receiving his doctorate in 1890 with the thesis Die Trilobitenfauna der ost- und westpreußischen Diluvialgeschiebe. In 1903 he became an associate professor in Munich, and from 1904 taught classes in geology and mineralogy at the agricultural college in Hohenheim.

In 1907 he relocated to the University of Göttingen, where he eventually became a full professor of geology and paleontology. From 1913 he worked as a professor at Tübingen, then in 1917 moved to the University of Berlin as successor to Wilhelm von Branca. At Berlin, he was appointed director of Geologisch-Paläontologischen Institut und Museum.

Selected publications
 Pompeckj JF. Ueber Aucellen und Aucellen-ähnliche Formen. Neues Jahrbuch für Mineralogie, Geologie und Paläontologie. 1881
 Pompeckj JF. Uber Ammonoideen mit anormaler Wohnkammer.  Jahreshefte des Vereins für Vaterländische Naturkunde, 1884
 Pompeckj JF. Die Fauna des Cambriums von Tejřovic und Skrej in Böhmen. Jahrbuch der Geologischen Reichsanstalt, 1896
 Pompeckj JF. Uber Calymene Brongniart. Neues Jahrbüch für Mineralogie, 1898
 Pompeckj JF. Marines Mesozoikum von König Karls Land. Stockholm, Vet.-Akad. Öfvers., Arg, 1899
 Pompeckj JF. Pompeckj JF. Jura-Fossilien aus Alaska. Verhandlungen der Kaiserlichen Russischen Mineralogischen Gesellschaft zu St. Petersburg. Zweite Serie. Bd.XXXVIII. Nr.1. 239-282. 1900 PDF
 Pompeckj JF. Die Juraablagerungen zwischen Regensburg und Regenstauf. Geogn. Jahrb, 1901
 Pompeckj JF. Ueber Aucellen und Aucellen-ähnliche Formen.—Neues Jahrb. f. Min., Geol. u. Palaeontol. Bd XIV
 Pompeckj JF. Aus dem Tremadoc der Montagne Noire (Süd-Frankreich). Neues Jahrbuch fur Mineralogie, Geologie und Palaontologie, 1902
 Pompeckj JF. Die zoogeographischen Beziehungen zwischen den Jurameeren NW-und S-Deutschlands. J.-Ber. nieders. geol. Ver., Hannover, 1908
 Pompeckj JF. Über einen Fund von Mosasaurier-Resten im Ober-Senon von Haldem. 1910
 Pompeckj JF. Zur Rassenpersistenz der Ammoniten. Jahresbericht des Niedersachischen Geologischen Vereins, 1910
 Pompeckj JF. Amphineura-Palaontologie. Handworterbuch der Naturwissenschaften, 1912
 Pompeckj JF. Das Meer des Kupferschiefers. Sonderabdruck aus der Branca-Festschrift. (Leipzig, Gebrüder Borntraeger, 1914).
 Pompeckj JF. Die Bedeutung des Schwäbischen Jura für die Erdgeschichte. Stuttgart, 1914
 Kupferschiefer und Kupferschiefermeer. Zeitschrift der Deutschen Gesellschaft für Geowissenschaften, Band 72.   p. 329-339
 Pompeckj JF. Das Ohrskelett von Zeuglodon. Senckenbergiana, 1922
 Pompeckj JF. Ammoniten des Rhät
 Pompeckj JF. Ein neues Zeugnis uralten Lebens. Paläontologische Zeitschrift 9: 287–313. 1927
 Schuchert C, LeVene CM, Pompeckj JF. Brachiopoda:(generum et genotyporum index et bibliographia). 1929 W. Junk, Berlin

References 

1867 births
1930 deaths
People from Olsztyn County
People from East Prussia
19th-century German geologists
German paleontologists
Academic staff of the University of Göttingen
Academic staff of the University of Tübingen
Academic staff of the Humboldt University of Berlin
University of Königsberg alumni
Scientists active at the Museum für Naturkunde, Berlin
20th-century German geologists